Sandro Nicević (born June 16, 1976 in Pula, SR Croatia, SFR Yugoslavia) is a retired Croatian professional basketball player, who last played for Orlandina Basket in the Italian Serie A.

Professional career
Nicević started playing basketball at his hometown club Gradine Pula. Soon he attracted interest of Croatian powerhouse Cibona Zagreb. After two seasons at Cibona's feeder teams Franck and Benston, Nicević joined Cibona's first squad and become crucial team member. In 2001 Nicević left Cibona starting his tour all around Europe, playing in Slovenia (Olimpija), France (Le Mans), Greece (AEK), Spain (Málaga), Turkey (Beşiktaş) and Italy (Treviso and Montegranaro).

After initially retiring in 2012, Nicević reactivated his career to help his former clubs. First in January 2013 he played one promotion game for Treviso, his former club that went to lower Italian league after main sponsor Benetton family withdrew from it. In February 2013 it was revealed that Nicević signed for Cibona, his former club facing financial troubles. In his first game with Cibona he scored a buzzer beater in Croatian Cup final against Cedevita.

In July 2013 Nicević accepted offer from Italian second division side Orlandina Basket.

Croatian national team
Nicević has been a member of the Croatian national basketball team. He played at the EuroBasket 1997, the EuroBasket 2003, the 2008 Olympics, and the EuroBasket 2009.

References

External links
Euroleague.net Profile
Eurobasket.com Profile
TBLStat.net Profile

1976 births
Living people
AEK B.C. players
Basketball players at the 2008 Summer Olympics
Beşiktaş men's basketball players
Baloncesto Málaga players
Centers (basketball)
Croatian men's basketball players
Croatian expatriate basketball people in Spain
KK Cibona players
KK Olimpija players
Le Mans Sarthe Basket players
Lega Basket Serie A players
Liga ACB players
Olympic basketball players of Croatia
Orlandina Basket players
Pallacanestro Treviso players
Sportspeople from Pula
Sutor Basket Montegranaro players
KK Dubrava players